First Presbyterian Church of Avon is a historic Presbyterian church located at East Avon in Livingston County, New York.  It is a three- by six-bay Federal style brick building, approximately 46 feet by 60 feet. The center of the principal elevation features a three-story bell tower surmounted by a six sided, broached spire.  Construction of the building started in 1812 and it was dedicated in 1827.  In 1866 the existing church was renovated and the present tower added.

It was listed on the National Register of Historic Places in 2005.

References

External links
First Presbyterian Church of East Avon - Presbytery of Genesee Valley website

Churches on the National Register of Historic Places in New York (state)
Presbyterian churches in New York (state)
Federal architecture in New York (state)
1827 establishments in New York (state)
Churches completed in 1866
19th-century Presbyterian church buildings in the United States
Churches in Livingston County, New York
National Register of Historic Places in Livingston County, New York